Joe Loyd Sweeden is an American politician. He served as a member of the Oklahoma Senate representing District 10, which includes Kay, Osage, Pawnee and Payne counties, from 2006 to 2010. He previously served in the Oklahoma House of Representatives from 1999 through 2006.

References

External links

Project Vote Smart - Joe Loyd Sweeden (OK) profile
Follow the Money - Joe Sweeden
2008 2006 campaign contributions

1961 births
Living people
Democratic Party Oklahoma state senators
Democratic Party members of the Oklahoma House of Representatives
21st-century American politicians